"Heaven Sent" is the first single from Australian rock band INXS's eighth studio album, Welcome to Wherever You Are (1992). It was released only in Europe, Japan, and Australia. The song was written by Andrew Farriss who explained on the liner notes of the 2002 remaster: "Originally I wrote the song as a 3/4 ballad. The band heard it and rocked it up to make it the recording it became. The vocal effect helped give the track some extra attitude."

B-sides
The b-sides included two solo compositions from Andrew Farriss; "It Ain't Easy", and Tim Farriss; "11th Revolution" as well as, "Deepest Red", a full band outtake from the X album written by Michael Hutchence and Jon Farriss. The 12" picture disc (UK) and also the Australian CD5 single included a demo version of "Heaven Sent (Gliding version)" instead of "Deepest Red".

Reception
Q noted the, "slashing guitar tone. A more conventional INXS song apart from the snarling "megaphone" vocal, redolent of Stooges-era Iggy Pop. But where the old INXS were all weighed down with big-funk pretensions, this has an air of pure unselfconscious glee. It rocks."

Track listing
UK 7-inch and cassette single
 "Heaven Sent"
 "It Ain't Easy"

UK 12-inch picture single
 "Heaven Sent"
 "It Ain't Easy"
 "11th Revolution"
 "Heaven Sent (Gliding version)"

CD5 – 45099-0115-2 EastWest/Australia
 "Heaven Sent"
 "It Ain't Easy"
 "11th Revolution"
 "Deepest Red"
 "Heaven Sent (Gliding version)"

CD5 – INXCD 19 Mercury/UK limited edition collector's box
 "Heaven Sent"
 "It Ain't Easy"
 "11th Revolution"
 "Deepest Red"

CD3 – WMD5-4108 WEA/Japan
 "Heaven Sent"
 "It Ain't Easy"

Charts

Release history

References

INXS songs
1992 singles
1992 songs
East West Records singles
Mercury Records singles
Song recordings produced by Mark Opitz
Songs written by Andrew Farriss
Songs written by Michael Hutchence